EOS-02 (formerly known as Microsat-2A) was an Indian Earth observation microsatellite developed by the Indian Space Research Organisation as a test payload on the maiden launch of the Small Satellite Launch Vehicle (SSLV). EOS-02 was based on Microsat-TD. The objective behind EOS-02 was to realize and fly an experimental imaging satellite with short turnaround time to showcase launch on demand capability. 

It was intended to be used for cartographic applications at a cadastral level, urban and rural management, coastal land use and regulation, utilities mapping, development and various other GIS applications. The satellite carried two payloads: a mid-wavelength and a long-wavelength infared camera with a 6m resolution.

Launch
EOS-02 was launched on Small Satellite Launch Vehicle's maiden flight SSLV-D1 at 03:48 UTC / 09:18 IST on 7 August 2022, but due to the final VTM stage failure, the rocket entered a transatmospheric orbit of 356 km x 76 km (221 mi x 47 mi) instead of the planned circular 356 km (221 mi) circular orbit. As a result, both satellites onboard (EOS-02 and AzaadiSAT) were destroyed during reentry.

References

Earth observation satellites of India
Spacecraft launched by India in 2022
Small satellites